Into the Eyes of the Zombie King is the seventh studio album by American experimental rock band Chrome, released in 1984 by French record label Mosquito. It was Chrome's first album since the departure of Helios Creed following 1982's 3rd from the Sun. The album was reissued in 1986 on by German label Dossier.

Reception 

AllMusic called the album "the first signpost on a dreadful slide for [Damon] Edge into unfortunate obscurity".

Tracklist

References

External links 

 

Chrome (band) albums
1984 albums